The Philistines (Koine Greek (LXX): Φυλιστιείμ, romanized: Phulistieím) were an ancient people who lived on the south coast of Canaan from the 12th century BC until 604 BC, when their polity, after having already been subjugated for centuries by the Neo-Assyrian Empire, was finally destroyed by King Nebuchadnezzar II of the Neo-Babylonian Empire. After becoming part of his empire and its successor, the Persian Empire, they lost their distinct ethnic identity and disappeared from the historical and archaeological record by the late 5th century BC. The Philistines are known for their biblical conflict with the Israelites.

Etymology
The English term Philistine comes from Old French ; from Classical Latin ; from Late Greek ; ultimately from Hebrew Pəlištî (plural P'lishtim), meaning 'people of P'lesheth'; and there are cognates in Akkadian (aka Assyrian, Babylonian)  and Egyptian ; the term Palestine has the same derivation. The native Philistine endonym is unknown.

The Hebrew term  occurs 286 times in the Masoretic Text of the Hebrew Bible (of which 152 times are in 1 Samuel). It also appears in the Samaritan Pentateuch. In the Greek version of the Bible, called Septuagint, the equivalent term Phulistieím (Φυλιστιείμ) occurs 12 times, again in the Pentateuch.

In secondary literature, "Philistia" is further mentioned in the Aramaic Visions of Amram (4Q543-7), which is dated "prior to Antiochus IV and the Hasmonean revolt," possibly to the time of High Priest of Israel Onias II; Jubilees 46:1-47:1 might have used Amram as a source.

Outside of pre-Maccabean Israelite religious literature, evidence for the name and the origins of the Philistines is less abundant and less consistent. In the remainder of the Hebrew Bible,  is attested at Qumran for 2 Samuel 5:17. In the Septuagint, however, 269 references instead use the term  ('of another tribe').

History 
During the Late Bronze Age collapse, an apparent confederation of seafarers known as the Sea Peoples are recorded as attacking ancient Egypt and other Eastern Mediterranean civilizations. While their exact origins are a mystery, and probably diverse, it is generally agreed that the Sea Peoples had origins in the greater Southern European area, including western Asia Minor, the Aegean, and the islands of the Mediterranean. Egypt, in particular, repelled numerous attempted invasions from the Sea Peoples, most famously at the Battle of the Delta, where the pharaoh Ramesses III defeated a massive invasion force which had already plundered Hattusa, Carchemish, Cyprus, and the Southern Levant. Egyptian sources name one of these implicated Sea Peoples as the pwrꜣsꜣtj, generally transliterated as either Peleset or Pulasti. Following the Sea Peoples' defeat, Ramesses III allegedly relocated a number of the pwrꜣsꜣtj to southern Canaan, as recorded in an inscription from his funerary temple in Medinet Habu, and the Great Harris Papyrus. Though archaeological investigation has been unable to correlate any such settlement existing during this time period, this, coupled with the name Peleset/Pulasti and the peoples' supposed Aegean origins, have led many scholars to identify the pwrꜣsꜣtj with the Philistines.

Typically "Philistine" artifacts begin appearing in Canaan by the 12th century BCE. Pottery of Philistine origin has been found far outside of what would later become the core of Philistia, including at the majority of Iron Age I sites in the Jezreel Valley; however, because the quantity of said pottery finds are light, it is assumed that the Philistines' presence in these areas were not as strong as in their core territory, and that they probably were a minority which had assimilated into the native Canaanite population by the 10th century BCE.

There is little evidence that the Sea Peoples forcefully injected themselves into the southern Levant; and the cities which would become the core of Philistine territory, such as Ashdod, Ashkelon, Gath, and Ekron, show nearly no signs of an intervening event marked by destruction. The same can be said for Aphek where an Egyptian garrison was destroyed, likely in an act of warfare at the end of the 13th century, which was followed by a local Canaanite phase, which was then followed by the peaceful introduction of Philistine pottery. The lack of destruction by the Sea Peoples in the southern Levant should not be surprising as Canaan was never mentioned in any text describing the Sea Peoples as a target of destruction or attack by the Sea Peoples. Other sites such as Tell Keisan, Acco, Tell Abu Hawam, Tel Dor, Tel Mevorak, Tel Zeror, Tel Michal, Tel Gerisa, and Tel Batash, have no evidence of a destruction ca. 1200 BCE.

By Iron Age II, the Philistines had formed an ethnic state centered around a pentapolis consisting of Ashkelon, Ashdod, Ekron, Gath, and Gaza (generally known as Philistia). Whether or not historians are inclined to accept the historicity of the old canonical books of the Hebrew nation, their writers describe a series of conflicts between the Philistines and the Israelites during the period of the Judges, and, allegedly, the Philistines exercised lordship over Israel in the days of Saul and Samuel the prophet, forbidding the Israelites from making iron implements of war. According to their chronicles, the Philistines were eventually subjugated by David, before regaining independence in the wake of the United Monarchy's dissolution, after which there are only sparse references to them. The accuracy of these narratives is a subject of debate among scholars.

The Philistines seemed to have generally retained their autonomy, barring a few periods of partial Israelite and Judahite suzerainty, up until the era of the Neo-Assyrian Empire. In the mid-8th century BC, Tiglath-Pileser III marched into the southern Levant, conquering Aram-Damascus, and occupying the remaining kingdoms in the area, including Philistia. Decades later, Egypt began agitating its neighbors to rebel against Assyrian occupation. A revolt in Israel was devastatingly crushed by 722 BC, resulting in the kingdom's total destruction. In 712 BC, a Philistine named Iamani ascended to the throne of Ashdod, and organized another failed uprising against Assyria with Egyptian aid. The Assyrian King Sargon II invaded Philistia, which effectively became annexed by Assyria, although the kings of the five cities, including Iamani, were allowed to remain on their thrones. In his annals concerning the campaign, Sargon II singled out his capture of Gath, in 711 BC. Ten years later, Egypt once again incited its neighbors to rebel against Assyria, resulting in Ashkelon, Ekron, Judah, and Sidon revolting against Sargon's son and successor, Sennacherib. Sennacherib squashed the revolt, and destroyed much of the cities in Phoenicia, Philistia, and Judah, though he was unable to capture the Judahite capital, Jerusalem. As punishment, the rebel nations paid tribute to Assyria, and Sennacherib's annals report that he exacted such tribute from the kings of Ashdod, Ashkelon, Gaza, and Ekron, but Gath is never mentioned, which may indicate that the city was actually destroyed by Sargon II.

The Philistines disappear from written record following the conquest of the Levant by the Babylonian king Nebuchadnezzar II towards the end of the 7th century BC, when Ashkelon, Ekron and many other cities from the region were completely destroyed.

Biblical accounts

In the Book of Genesis, the Philistines are said to descend from the Casluhites, an Egyptian people. However, according to rabbinic sources, these Philistines were different from those described in the Deuteronomistic history. Deuteronomist sources describe the "Five Lords of the Philistines" as based in five city-states of the southwestern Levant: Gaza, Ashkelon, Ashdod, Ekron, and Gath, from Wadi Gaza in the south to the Yarqon River in the north. This description portrays them at one period of time as among the Kingdom of Israel's most dangerous enemies. In the Septuagint, the term , which means simply "other nations", is used instead of "Philistines".

Torah (Pentateuch) 
With regard to descendants of Mizraim, the biblical progenitor of the Egyptians, the Table of Nations in Genesis 10 states in Hebrew: "ve-et Patrusim ve-et Kasluhim asher yats'u mi-sham Plištim ve-et Kaftorim." Literally, it says that those whom Mizraim begat included "the Pathrusim, Casluhim, out of whom came the Philistines, and the Caphtorim."

There is some debate among interpreters as to whether this verse was originally intended to signify that the Philistines themselves were the offspring of the Casluhim or the Caphtorim. While the Casluhim or the Caphtorim origin was widely followed by some 19th-century biblical scholars, others such as Friedrich Schwally, Bernhard Stade, and Cornelis Tiele argued for a Semitic origin. Interestingly, the Caphtorites were considered to derive from Crete while Cashluhim derived from Cyrenaica, which was part of the province Crete and Cyrenaica in Roman times, which alludes to the similarities between them. 

The Torah does not record the Philistines as one of the nations to be displaced from Canaan. In Genesis 15:18-21, the Philistines are absent from the ten nations Abraham's descendants will displace as well as being absent from the list of nations Moses tells the people they will conquer, though the land in which they resided is included in the boundaries based on the locations of rivers described. In fact, the Philistines, through their Capthorite ancestors, were allowed to conquer the land from the Avvites. God also directed the Israelites away from the Philistines upon their Exodus from Egypt according to Exodus 13:17. In Genesis 21:22-17, Abraham agrees to a covenant of kindness with Abimelech, the Philistine king, and his descendants. Abraham's son Isaac deals with the Philistine king similarly, by concluding a treaty with them in chapter 26.

Unlike most other ethnic groups in the Bible, the Philistines are almost always referred to without the definite article in the Torah.

Deuteronomistic history

Rabbinic sources state that the Philistines of Genesis were different people from the Philistines of the Deuteronomistic history (the series of books from Joshua to 2 Kings). According to the Talmud (Chullin 60b), the Philistines of Genesis intermingled with the Avvites. This differentiation was also held by the authors of the Septuagint (LXX), who translated (rather than transliterated) its base text as allophuloi ('other nations') instead of philistines throughout the Books of Judges and Samuel.

Throughout the Deuteronomistic history, Philistines are almost always referred to without the definite article, except on 11 occasions. On the basis of the LXX's regular translation into "allophyloi", Robert Drews states that the term "Philistines" means simply "non-Israelites of the Promised Land" when used in the context of Samson, Saul and David.

Judges 13:1 tells that the Philistines dominated the Israelites in the times of Samson, who fought and killed over a thousand. According to 1 Samuel 5–6, they even captured the Ark of the Covenant for a few months.

A few biblical texts, such as the Ark Narrative and stories reflecting the importance of Gath, seem to portray Late Iron I and Early Iron II memories. They are mentioned more than 250 times, the majority in the Deuteronomistic history, and are depicted as among the arch-enemies of the Israelites, a serious and recurring threat before being subdued by David.

The Bible paints the Philistines as the main enemy of the Israelites (prior to the rise of the Neo-Assyrian Empire and Neo-Babylonian Empire) with a state of almost perpetual war between the two. The Philistine cities lost their independence to Assyria, and revolts in the following years were all crushed. They were subsequently absorbed into the Neo-Babylonian Empire and the Achaemenid Empire, and disappeared as a distinct ethnic group by the late 5th century BC.

The Prophets
Amos in 1:8 sets the Philistines / ἀλλοφύλοι at Ashdod and Ekron. In 9:7 God is quoted asserting that, as he brought Israel from Egypt, he also brought the Philistines from Caphtor. In the Greek this is, instead, bringing the ἀλλόφυλοι from Cappadocia.

The Bible books of Jeremiah, Ezekiel, Amos and Zephaniah speak of the destruction of the Philistines.

The following is a list of battles described in the Bible as having occurred between the Israelites and the Philistines:
 The Battle of Shephelah
 Israelites defeated at the Battle of Aphek, Philistines capture the Ark
 Philistines defeated at the Battle of Eben-Ezer
Some Philistine military success must have taken place subsequently, allowing the Philistines to subject the Israelites to a localised disarmament regime. 1 Samuel 13:19-21 states that no Israelite blacksmiths were permitted and they had to go to the Philistines to sharpen their weapons and agricultural implements.
 Battle of Michmash, Philistines routed by Jonathan and his men
 Near the Valley of Elah, David defeats Goliath in single combat
 The Philistines defeat Israelites on Mount Gilboa, killing King Saul and his three sons Jonathan, Abinadab and Malkishua
 Hezekiah defeats the Philistines as far as Gaza and its territory.

Origin
Several theories are given about the origins of the Philistines. The Hebrew Bible mentions in two places that they originate from a geographical region known as Caphtor (possibly Crete/Minoa), although the Hebrew chronicles also state that the Philistines were descended from Casluhim, one of the 7 sons of Ham's second son, Miṣrayim. The Septuagint connects the Philistines to other biblical groups such as Caphtorim and the Cherethites and Pelethites, which have been identified with the island of Crete. This, among other things, has led to the modern theory of Philistines having an Aegean origin. In 2016, a large Philistine cemetery was discovered near Ashkelon, containing more than 150 dead buried in oval-shaped graves. A 2019 genetic study found that, while all three Ashkelon populations derive most of their ancestry from the local Semitic-speaking Levantine gene pool, the early Iron Age population was genetically distinct due to a European-related admixture; this genetic signal is no longer detectable in the later Iron Age population. According to the authors, the admixture was likely due to a "gene flow from a European-related gene pool" during the Bronze to Iron Age transition, which supports the theory that a migration event occurred. Philistine DNA shows similarities to that of ancient Cretans, but it is impossible to specify the exact place in Europe from where Philistines had migrated to Levant, due to limited number of ancient genomes available for study, "with 20 to 60 per cent similarity to DNA from ancient skeletons from Crete and Iberia and that from modern people living in Sardinia."

Scholarly consensus 
Most scholars agree that the Philistines were of Greek origin, and that they came from Crete and the rest of the Aegean Islands or, more generally, from the area of modern-day Greece. This view is based largely upon the fact that archaeologists, when digging up strata dated to the Philistine time-period in the coastal plains and in adjacent areas, have found similarities in material culture (figurines, pottery, fire-stands, etc.) between Aegean-Greek culture and that of Philistine culture, suggesting that they were originally one and the same people. A minority, dissenting, claim that the similarities in material culture is only the result of acculturation, during their entire 575 years of existence among Canaanite (Phoenician), Israelite, and perhaps other seafaring peoples.

The "Peleset" from Egyptian inscriptions

Since 1846, scholars have connected the biblical Philistines with the Egyptian "" inscriptions. All five of these appear from 1150 BCE to 900 BCE just as archaeological references to Kinaḫḫu, or Ka-na-na (Canaan), come to an end; and since 1873 comparisons were drawn between them and to the Aegean "Pelasgians." Archaeological research to date has been unable to corroborate a mass settlement of Philistines during the Ramesses III era.

"Walistina/Falistina" and "Palistin" in Syria

Pro
A Walistina is mentioned in Luwian texts already variantly spelled Palistina. This implies dialectical variation, a phoneme ("f"?) inadequately described in the script, or both. Falistina was a kingdom somewhere on the Amuq plain, where the Amurru kingdom had held sway before it.

In 2003, a statue of a king named Taita bearing inscriptions in Luwian was discovered during excavations conducted by German archaeologist Kay Kohlmeyer in the Citadel of Aleppo. The new readings of Anatolian hieroglyphs proposed by the Hittitologists Elisabeth Rieken and Ilya Yakubovich were conducive to the conclusion that the country ruled by Taita was called Palistin. This country extended in the 11th-10th centuries BCE from the Amouq Valley in the west to Aleppo in the east down to Mehardeh and Shaizar in the south.

Due to the similarity between Palistin and Philistines, Hittitologist John David Hawkins (who translated the Aleppo inscriptions) hypothesizes a connection between the Syro-Hittite Palistin and the Philistines, as do archaeologists Benjamin Sass and Kay Kohlmeyer. Gershon Galil suggests that King David halted the Arameans' expansion into the Land of Israel on account of his alliance with the southern Philistine kings, as well as with Toi, king of Ḥamath, who is identified with Tai(ta) II, king of Palistin (the northern Sea Peoples).

Contra
However, the relation between Palistin and the Philistines is much debated. Israeli professor Itamar Singer notes that there is nothing (besides the name) in the recently discovered archaeology that indicates an Aegean origin to Palistin; most of the discoveries at the Palistin capital Tell Tayinat indicate a Neo-Hittite state, including the names of the kings of Palistin. Singer proposes (based on archaeological finds) that a branch of the Philistines settled in Tell Tayinat and were replaced or assimilated by a new Luwian population who took the Palistin name.

phyle histia theory

Allen Jones (1972 & 1975) suggests that the name Philistine represents a corruption of the Greek phyle-histia ('tribe of the hearth'), with the Ionic spelling of hestia. Stephanos Vogazianos (1993) states that Jones "only answers problems by analogy and he mainly speculates" but notes that the root phyle may not at all be out of place. Regarding this theory, Israel Finkelstein & Nadav Na'aman (1994) note the hearth constructions which have been discovered at Tell Qasile and Ekron.

Archaeological evidence

Territory

According to Joshua 13:3 and 1 Samuel 6:17, the land of the Philistines (or Allophyloi), called Philistia, was a pentapolis in the southwestern Levant comprising the five city-states of Gaza, Ashkelon, Ashdod, Ekron, and Gath, from Wadi Gaza in the south to the Yarqon River in the north, but with no fixed border to the east.

Tell Qasile (a "port city") and Aphek were located on the northern frontier of Philistine territory, and Tell Qasile in particular may have been inhabited by both Philistine and non-Philistine people.

The location of Gath is not entirely certain, although the site of Tell es-Safi, not far from Ekron, is currently the most favoured.

The identity of the city of Ziklag, which according to the Bible marked the border between the Philistine and Israelite territory, remains uncertain.

In the western part of the Jezreel Valley, 23 of the 26 Iron Age I sites (12th to 10th centuries BCE) yielded typical Philistine pottery. These sites include Tel Megiddo, Tel Yokneam, Tel Qiri, Afula, Tel Qashish, Be'er Tiveon, Hurvat Hazin, Tel Risim, Tel Re'ala, Hurvat Tzror, Tel Sham, Midrakh Oz and Tel Zariq. Scholars have attributed the presence of Philistine pottery in northern Israel to their role as mercenaries for the Egyptians during the Egyptian military administration of the land in the 12th century BCE. This presence may also indicate further expansion of the Philistines to the valley during the 11th century BCE, or their trade with the Israelites. There are biblical references to Philistines in the valley during the times of the Judges. The quantity of Philistine pottery within these sites is still quite small, showing that even if the Philistines did settle the valley, they were a minority that blended within the Canaanite population during the 12th century BCE. The Philistines seem to have been present in the southern valley during the 11th century, which may relate to the biblical account of their victory at the Battle of Gilboa.

Egyptian inscriptions
Since Edward Hincks and William Osburn Jr. in 1846, biblical scholars have connected the biblical Philistines with the Egyptian "Peleset" inscriptions; and since 1873, both have been connected with the Aegean "Pelasgians". The evidence for these connections is etymological and has been disputed.

Based on the Peleset inscriptions, it has been suggested that the Casluhite Philistines formed part of the conjectured "Sea Peoples" who repeatedly attacked Egypt during the later Nineteenth Dynasty. Though they were eventually repulsed by Ramesses III, he finally resettled them, according to the theory, to rebuild the coastal towns in Canaan. Papyrus Harris I details the achievements of the reign (1186–1155 BC) of Ramesses III. In the brief description of the outcome of the battles in Year 8 is the description of the fate of some of the conjectured Sea Peoples. Ramesses claims that, having brought the prisoners to Egypt, he "settled them in strongholds, bound in my name. Numerous were their classes, hundreds of thousands strong. I taxed them all, in clothing and grain from the storehouses and granaries each year." Some scholars suggest it is likely that these "strongholds" were fortified towns in southern Canaan, which would eventually become the five cities (the Pentapolis) of the Philistines. Israel Finkelstein has suggested that there may be a period of 25–50 years after the sacking of these cities and their reoccupation by the Philistines. It is possible that at first, the Philistines were housed in Egypt; only subsequently late in the troubled end of the reign of Ramesses III would they have been allowed to settle Philistia.

The "Peleset" appear in four different texts from the time of the New Kingdom. Two of these, the inscriptions at Medinet Habu and the Rhetorical Stela at Deir al-Medinah, are dated to the time of the reign of Ramesses III (1186–1155 BC). Another was composed in the period immediately following the death of Ramesses III (Papyrus Harris I). The fourth, the Onomasticon of Amenope, is dated to some time between the end of the 12th or early 11th century BC.

The inscriptions at Medinet Habu consist of images depicting a coalition of Sea Peoples, among them the Peleset, who are said in the accompanying text to have been defeated by Ramesses III during his Year 8 campaign. In about 1175 BC, Egypt was threatened with a massive land and sea invasion by the "Sea Peoples," a coalition of foreign enemies which included the Tjeker, the Shekelesh, the Deyen, the Weshesh, the Teresh, the Sherden, and the PRST. They were comprehensively defeated by Ramesses III, who fought them in "Djahy" (the eastern Mediterranean coast) and at "the mouths of the rivers" (the Nile Delta), recording his victories in a series of inscriptions in his mortuary temple at Medinet Habu. Scholars have been unable to conclusively determine which images match what peoples described in the reliefs depicting two major battle scenes. A separate relief on one of the bases of the Osirid pillars with an accompanying hieroglyphic text clearly identifying the person depicted as a captive Peleset chief is of a bearded man without headdress. This has led to the interpretation that Ramesses III defeated the Sea Peoples, including Philistines, and settled their captives in fortresses in southern Canaan; another related theory suggests that Philistines invaded and settled the coastal plain for themselves. The soldiers were quite tall and clean-shaven. They wore breastplates and short kilts, and their superior weapons included chariots drawn by two horses. They carried small shields and fought with straight swords and spears.

The Rhetorical Stela are less discussed, but are noteworthy in that they mention the Peleset together with a people called the Teresh, who sailed "in the midst of the sea". The Teresh are thought to have originated from the Anatolian coast and their association with the Peleset in this inscription is seen as providing some information on the possible origin and identity of the Philistines.

The Harris Papyrus, which was found in a tomb at Medinet Habu, also recalls Ramesses III's battles with the Sea Peoples, declaring that the Peleset were "reduced to ashes." The Papyrus Harris I, records how the defeated foe were brought in captivity to Egypt and settled in fortresses. The Harris papyrus can be interpreted in two ways: either the captives were settled in Egypt and the rest of the Philistines/Sea Peoples carved out a territory for themselves in Canaan, or else it was Ramesses himself who settled the Sea Peoples (mainly Philistines) in Canaan as mercenaries. Egyptian strongholds in Canaan are also mentioned, including a temple dedicated to Amun, which some scholars place in Gaza; however, the lack of detail indicating the precise location of these strongholds means that it is unknown what impact these had, if any, on Philistine settlement along the coast.

The only mention in an Egyptian source of the Peleset in conjunction with any of the five cities that are said in the Bible to have made up the Philistine pentapolis comes in the Onomasticon of Amenope. The sequence in question has been translated as: "Ashkelon, Ashdod, Gaza, Assyria, Shubaru [...] Sherden, Tjekker, Peleset, Khurma [...]" Scholars have advanced the possibility that the other Sea Peoples mentioned were connected to these cities in some way as well.

Material culture: Aegean origin and historical evolution

Aegean connection

Many scholars have interpreted the ceramic and technological evidence attested to by archaeology as being associated with the Philistine advent in the area as strongly suggestive that they formed part of a large scale immigration to southern Canaan, probably from Anatolia and Cyprus, in the 12th century BCE.

The proposed connection between Mycenaean culture and Philistine culture was further documented by finds at the excavation of Ashdod, Ekron, Ashkelon, and more recently Gath, four of the five Philistine cities in Canaan. The fifth city is Gaza. Especially notable is the early Philistine pottery, a locally made version of the Aegean Mycenaean Late Helladic IIIC pottery, which is decorated in shades of brown and black. This later developed into the distinctive Philistine pottery of the Iron Age I, with black and red decorations on white slip known as Philistine Bichrome ware. Also of particular interest is a large, well-constructed building covering , discovered at Ekron. Its walls are broad, designed to support a second story, and its wide, elaborate entrance leads to a large hall, partly covered with a roof supported on a row of columns. In the floor of the hall is a circular hearth paved with pebbles, as is typical in Mycenaean megaron hall buildings; other unusual architectural features are paved benches and podiums. Among the finds are three small bronze wheels with eight spokes. Such wheels are known to have been used for portable cultic stands in the Aegean region during this period, and it is therefore assumed that this building served cultic functions. Further evidence concerns an inscription in Ekron to PYGN or PYTN, which some have suggested refers to "Potnia", the title given to an ancient Mycenaean goddess. Excavations in Ashkelon, Ekron, and Gath reveal dog and pig bones which show signs of having been butchered, implying that these animals were part of the residents' diet. Among other findings there are wineries where fermented wine was produced, as well as loom weights resembling those of Mycenaean sites in Greece.

Further evidence of the Aegean origin of the initial Philistine settlers was provided by studying their burial practices in the so far only discovered Philistine cemetery, excavated at Ashkelon (see below).

However, for many years scholars such as Gloria London, John Brug, Shlomo Bunimovitz, Helga Weippert, and Edward Noort, among others, have noted the "difficulty of associating pots with people", proposing alternative suggestions such as potters following their markets or technology transfer, and emphasize the continuities with the local world in the material remains of the coastal area identified with "Philistines", rather than the differences emerging from the presence of Cypriote and/or Aegean/ Mycenaean influences. The view is summed up in the idea that 'kings come and go, but cooking pots remain', suggesting that the foreign Aegean elements in the Philistine population may have been a minority.

Geographic evolution
Material culture evidence, primarily pottery styles, indicates that the Philistines originally settled in a few sites in the south, such as Ashkelon, Ashdod and Ekron. It was not until several decades later, about 1150 BC, that they expanded into surrounding areas such as the Yarkon region to the north (the area of modern Jaffa, where there were Philistine farmsteads at Tel Gerisa and Aphek, and a larger settlement at Tel Qasile). Most scholars, therefore, believe that the settlement of the Philistines took place in two stages. In the first, dated to the reign of Ramesses III, they were limited to the coastal plain, the region of the Five Cities; in the second, dated to the collapse of Egyptian hegemony in southern Canaan, their influence spread inland beyond the coast. During the 10th to 7th centuries BC, the distinctiveness of the material culture appears to have been absorbed with that of surrounding peoples.

Burial practices
The Leon Levy Expedition, consisting of archaeologists from Harvard University, Boston College, Wheaton College in Illinois and Troy University in Alabama, conducted a 30-year investigation of the burial practices of the Philistines, by excavating a Philistine cemetery containing more than 150 burials dating from the 11th to 8th century BCE Tel Ashkelon. In July 2016, the expedition finally announced the results of their excavation.

Archaeological evidence, provided by architecture, burial arrangements, ceramics, and pottery fragments inscribed with non-Semitic writing, indicates that the Philistines were not native to Canaan. Most of the 150 dead were buried in oval-shaped graves, some were interred in ashlar chamber tombs, while there were 4 who were cremated. These burial arrangements were very common to the Aegean cultures, but not to the one indigenous to Canaan. Lawrence Stager of Harvard University believes that Philistines came to Canaan by ships before the Battle of the Delta circa 1175 BCE. DNA was extracted from the skeletons for archaeogenetic population analysis.

The Leon Levy Expedition, which has been going on since 1985, helped break down some of the previous assumptions that the Philistines were uncultured people by having evidence of perfume near the bodies in order for the deceased to smell it in the afterlife.

Genetic evidence

A study carried out on skeletons at Ashkelon in 2019 by an interdisciplinary team of scholars from the Max Planck Institute for the Science of Human History and the Leon Levy Expedition found that human remains at Ashkelon, associated with Philistines during the Iron Age, derived most of their ancestry from the local Levantine gene pool, but with a certain amount of Southern-European-related admixture. This confirms previous historic and archaeological records of a Southern-European migration event. The DNA suggests an influx of people of European heritage into Ashkelon in the twelfth century BC. The individuals' DNA shows similarities to that of ancient Cretans, but it is impossible to specify the exact place in Europe from where Philistines had migrated to Levant, due to limited number of ancient genomes available for study, "with 20 to 60 per cent similarity to DNA from ancient skeletons from Crete and Iberia and that from modern people living in Sardinia." 

After two centuries since their arrival, the Southern-European genetic markers were dwarfed by the local Levantine gene pool, suggesting intensive intermarriage, but the Philistine culture and peoplehood remained distinct from other local communities for six centuries. 

The finding fits with an understanding of the Philistines as an "entangled" or "transcultural" group consisting of peoples of various origins, said Aren Maeir, an archaeologist at Bar-Ilan University in Israel. "While I fully agree that there was a significant component of non-Levantine origins among the Philistines in the early Iron Age," he said, "these foreign components were not of one origin, and, no less important, they mixed with local Levantine populations from the early Iron Age onward." Laura Mazow, an archaeologist at East Carolina University in Greenville, N.C., said the research paper supported the idea that there was some migration from the west. She added that the findings "support the picture that we see in the archaeological record of a complex, multicultural process that has been resistant to reconstruction by any single historical model."

Modern archaeologists agree that the Philistines were different from their neighbors: their arrival on the eastern shores of the Mediterranean in the early 12th century B.C. is marked by pottery with close parallels to the ancient Greek world, the use of an Aegean —instead of a Semitic— script, and the consumption of pork. Nevertheless, Cretans were not too unfamiliar with the Levant, with connections being established since the Minoan era, as seen by their influence on Tel Kabri.

Population
The population of the area associated with Philistines is estimated to have been around 25,000 in the 12th century BC, rising to a peak of 30,000 in the 11th century BC. The Canaanite nature of the material culture and toponyms suggest that much of this population was indigenous, such that the migrant element would likely constitute less than half the total, and perhaps much less.

Language

Nothing is known for certain about the language of the Philistines. Pottery fragments from the period of around 1500–1000 BCE have been found bearing inscriptions in non-Semitic languages, including one in a Cypro-Minoan script. The Bible does not mention any language problems between the Israelites and the Philistines, as it does with other groups up to the Assyrian and Babylonian occupations. Later, Nehemiah 13:23-24 writing under the Achaemenids records that when Judean men intermarried women from Moab, Ammon and Philistine cities, half the offspring of Judean marriages with women from Ashdod could speak only their mother tongue, Ašdōdīṯ, not Judean Hebrew (Yehūdīṯ); although by then this language might have been an Aramaic dialect. There is some limited evidence in favour of the assumption that the Philistines were originally Indo-European-speakers, either from Greece or Luwian speakers from the coast of Asia Minor, on the basis of some Philistine-related words found in the Bible not appearing to be related to other Semitic languages. Such theories suggest that the Semitic elements in the language were borrowed from their neighbours in the region. For example, the Philistine word for captain, "seren", may be related to the Greek word tyrannos (thought by linguists to have been borrowed by the Greeks from an Anatolian language, such as Luwian or Lydian). Although most Philistine names are Semitic (such as Ahimelech, Mitinti, Hanun, and Dagon) some of the Philistine names, such as Goliath, Achish, and Phicol, appear to be of non-Semitic origin, and Indo-European etymologies have been suggested. Recent finds of inscriptions written in Hieroglyphic Luwian in Palistin substantiate a connection between the language of the kingdom of Palistin and the Philistines of the southwestern Levant.

Religion
The deities worshipped in the area were Baal, Astarte, Asherah, and Dagon, whose names or variations thereof had already appeared in the earlier attested Canaanite pantheon. Another name, attested on the Ekron Royal Dedicatory Inscription, is PT[-]YH, unique to the Philistine sphere and possibly representing a goddess in their pantheon, though an exact identity has been subject to scholarly debate. The Philistines may also have worshipped Qudshu and Anat.Gitin, Seymour, and Mordechai Cogan. "A New Type of Dedicatory Inscription from Ekron." Israel Exploration Journal, vol. 49, no. 3/4, Israel Exploration Society, 1999, pp. 193–202, http://www.jstor.org/stable/27926893.

Although the Bible cites Dagon as the main Philistine god, there is a stark lack of any evidence which indicates the Philistines had any particular proclivity to the worship of Dagon. In fact, no evidence of Dagon worship whatsoever is discernable at Philistine sites, with even theophoric names invoking the deity being absent from the already limited corpus of known Philistine names. A further assessment of the Iron Age I finds worship of Dagon in any immediate Canaanite context, let alone one which is indisputably Philistine, as seemingly non-existent. Still, this does not imply that worship of Dagon was completely unheard of amongst the Philistines, and multiple mentions of a city in Assyrian, Phoenician, and Egyptian sources known as Beth Dagon may imply the god was venerated in at least some parts of Philistia.

The most common material religious artefact finds from Philistine sites are goddess figurines/chairs, sometimes called Ashdoda. This seems to imply a dominant female figure, which is consistent with Ancient Aegean religion.

Economy
Cities excavated in the area attributed to Philistines give evidence of careful town planning, including industrial zones. The olive industry of Ekron alone includes about 200 olive oil installations. Engineers estimate that the city's production may have been more than 1,000 tons, 30 percent of Israel's present-day production.

There is considerable evidence for a large industry in fermented drink. Finds include breweries, wineries, and retail shops marketing beer and wine. Beer mugs and wine kraters are among the most common pottery finds.

The Philistines also seemed to be experienced metalworkers, as complex wares of gold, bronze, and iron, have been found at Philistine sites as early as the 12th century BC, as well as artisanal weaponry. Further evidence of the Philistine domination of the metallurgical market lies in the Hebrew Bible, which claims that the Israelites relied heavily on Philistine blacksmiths for iron tools and weapons, despite the near-constant state of war between the two groups.

See also
Museum of Philistine Culture, a museum displaying the major archaeological artifacts from the five ancient Philistine city-states
Palistin (or Walistin), a Syro-Hittite kingdom (11th–9th c. BC) in what is now NW Syria and the SE Turkish province of Hatay
Archaeology in Gaza

Notes

References

Citations

Sources

External links

Corinne Mamane Museum of Philistine Culture
National Geographic article
List of Biblical References to Philistines or Philistia
Tell es-Safi/Gath Archaeological Project Website
Tell es-Safi/Gath Archaeological Project Blog
Penn State University - The Sea Peoples and the Philistines (link broken)
Neal Bierling, Giving Goliath his Due: New Archaeological Light on the Philistines (1992) 

The Center for Online Judaic Studies: Ramesses III and the Philistines, 1175 BC
Biblical Archaeology Review - Yavneh Yields Over a Hundred Philistine Cult Stands
Neal Bierling. Giving Goliath His Due. New Archaeological Light on the Philistines 
Ashkelon dig

 
Ancient Israel and Judah
Ancient peoples
Book of Jubilees